The Grant Park 220 is a future NASCAR Cup Series race that will be held on a street circuit in Chicago, Illinois starting in 2023. This race will be the first ever street race contested in the NASCAR Cup Series. The NASCAR Xfinity Series race will also be held on the street course on the same weekend the day before the Cup Series race and will be the first street race contested for that series.

Background/history
On March 24, 2021, NASCAR announced that an imaginary street course in the Chicago Loop in Downtown Chicago would be the track for the fifth (and what turned out to be the final) race of the 2021 eNASCAR iRacing Pro Invitational Series. The iRacing event was broadcast live on NASCAR on Fox on Wednesday, June 2. Rick Ware Racing Cup Series driver James Davison would win the virtual Chicago street race. Ever since the announcement of the track's virtual creation for this iRacing event, there had been rumors and speculation that NASCAR would like to make this track a reality and have a street race in Chicago on the Cup Series schedule in the future. On July 7, 2022, Jordan Bianchi from The Athletic reported that an official announcement of a Chicago street race being added to the Cup Series schedule would come on July 19. On June 17, Adam Stern from Sports Business Journal suggested that the Chicago Street Course could replace Road America on the 2023 Cup Series schedule as any street course race would likely replace one of the road course races and Road America did not have a contract to have a Cup Series race in 2023. On July 19, the official announcement of the addition of the Chicago street race to the Cup Series schedule took place. After the announcement, NASCAR executive Ben Kennedy confirmed Stern's report of the Chicago street race replacing the race the race at Road America on the Cup Series schedule in a question and answer session with the media.

On March 7, 2023, NASCAR announced that the race would not have a title sponsor and would instead be named after the park in which the street course will pass by (Grant Park). (Similarly, the Xfinity Series Chicago street race was named The Loop 121 after the area of the city (the Chicago Loop) in which the street course is located.) It was also announced on that day that the Cup Series Chicago street race would be 220 miles and 100 laps in length.

Past winners

References

External links

2023 establishments in the United States
Annual sporting events in the United States
NASCAR Cup Series races
NASCAR races in Illinois
Recurring sporting events established in 2023
Sports competitions in Chicago